Asota chionea is a moth of the family Erebidae first described by Paul Mabille in 1878. It is found in Zaire.

References

Asota (moth)
Insects of the Democratic Republic of the Congo
Fauna of the Republic of the Congo
Moths of Africa
Moths described in 1878
Endemic fauna of the Democratic Republic of the Congo